Patosfa is a village in Somogy county, Hungary.

Etymology
According to the local legends the name was Padosfa. The scientific explanation states that it derives from the person name Potus or Patus. The village was known as Patusfalva in the Middle Ages.

External links 
 Street map (Hungarian)

References 

Populated places in Somogy County